The 2007 Baseball World Cup (BWC) was the 37th international Men's amateur baseball tournament. The tournament was sanctioned by the International Baseball Federation, which titled it the Amateur World Series from the 1938 tournament through the 1986 AWS. The tournament was held, for the second time, in Taiwan (which played as Chinese Taipei), from November 6 to 18. The United States defeated Cuba in the final, winning its third title.

There were 18 participating countries, split into two groups, with the first four of each group qualifying for the finals. Games were played in four cities: Taichung City (at Taichung Intercontinental Baseball Stadium and Taichung Baseball Field); Taipei City (at Tianmu Baseball Stadium);  New Taipei City (Xinzhuang Baseball Stadium; and Yunlin (Douliu Baseball Stadium).

At one time, Venezuela’s participation was in question due to possible sanctions to be considered by the International Baseball Federation in the wake of their refusal to grant visas to a youth team from Taichung to participate in the Youth World Baseball championships in August, 2007, but they were allowed to participate.  China was originally scheduled to participate in Pool B, but dropped out and was replaced by the Thai national team, who placed fifth behind China at the 2006 Asian Games.

The next two competitions were also held as the BWC tournament, which was replaced in 2015 by the quadrennial WBSC Premier12.

Group A

Table

Chinese Taipei is the official IBAF designation for the team representing the state officially referred to as the Republic of China, more commonly known as Taiwan. (See also political status of Taiwan for details.)
The IBAF, in agreement with the IBAF Executive Committee, has ruled on Panama starting play with five players without insurance cover on Nov. 7 and 8 during the 37th Baseball World Cup:
These five players were not eligible to play in the Games #3 and #11.
The Panama team must forfeit both Games #3 and #11.
The official result for Game #3 will be Spain 9, Panama 0.
The official result for Game #11 will be USA 9, Panama 0.
The official record and final standings will reflect these changes.

Schedule

With the exception of the opening game of the tournament, all group A games are played at Taichung Baseball Field, Taichung Intercontinental Baseball Stadium and Douliu Baseball Stadium.

Group B

Table

Schedule

All group B games are played either at Tienmu Baseball Stadium in Taipei City or at Xinzhuang Baseball Stadium in Taipei County.

Knockout rounds

Awards
The IBAF announced the following awards at the completion of the tournament.

See also
 List of sporting events in Taiwan

References

External links

Main Schedule
Official IBAF Website

Baseball World Cup
Baseball World Cup, 2007
Baseball World Cup, 2007
Sport in Taichung
2007
November 2007 sports events in Asia